The 1908 West Carmarthenshire by-election was a parliamentary by-election held for the House of Commons constituency of West Carmarthenshire in West Wales on 26 February 1908.

Vacancy
Under the provisions of the Succession to the Crown Act of 1707 and a number of subsequent Acts, MPs appointed to certain ministerial and legal offices were at this time required to seek re-election. The West Carmarthenshire by-election was caused by the appointment of the sitting Liberal MP, John Lloyd Morgan as Recorder of Swansea.

Candidates
Morgan, who had held the seat since 1889, having been unopposed at the general elections of 1900 and 1906 fought the seat again in the Liberal interest but, again, there were no nominations against him and he was therefore returned unopposed.

Results

See also
Lists of United Kingdom by-elections 
United Kingdom by-election records

References 

Unopposed ministerial by-elections to the Parliament of the United Kingdom in Welsh constituencies
West Carmarthenshire by-election
West Carmarthenshire by-election
1900s elections in Wales
20th century in Carmarthenshire
West Carmarthenshire by-election